National Highway 135C, commonly referred to as NH 135C is a national highway in India. It is a secondary route of National Highway 35.  NH-135C runs in the states of Uttar Pradesh and Madhya Pradesh in India.

Route 
NH135C connects Allahabad city in U.P. to Waidhan city in the state of Madhya Pradesh.
Uttar Pradesh
Allahabad (Prayagraj), Koraon, Drumondganj, Haliya, Adwa Dam, Pipra, Manigarha, Devri Bazar, Karondiya, - M.P. Border
Madhya Pradesh
U.P. Border - Bagdara, Chitrangi, Singrauli, Waidhan.

Junctions  

  Terminal near Allahabad(Prayagraj).
  near Drumanodganj
  Terminal near Waidhan.

See also 
 List of National Highways in India
 List of National Highways in India by state

References

External links 

 NH 135C on OpenStreetMap

National highways in India
National Highways in Uttar Pradesh
National Highways in Madhya Pradesh